Mordellistena confinis is a beetle in the genus Mordellistena of the family Mordellidae. It was described in 1854 by Oronzio Gabriele Costa.

References

confinis
Beetles described in 1854
Taxa named by Oronzio Gabriele Costa